The third season of Stargate Atlantis, an American-Canadian television series, began airing on July 21, 2006 on the US-American Sci Fi Channel. The third season concluded after 20 episodes on February 5, 2007 on the Canadian The Movie Network. The series was developed by Brad Wright and Robert C. Cooper, who also served as executive producers. Season three regular cast members include Joe Flanigan, Torri Higginson, Rachel Luttrell, Jason Momoa, Paul McGillion, and David Hewlett as Dr. Rodney McKay.

Cast
 Starring Joe Flanigan as Lt. Colonel John Sheppard
 Torri Higginson as Dr. Elizabeth Weir
 Rachel Luttrell as Teyla Emmagan
 Jason Momoa as Ronon Dex
 With Paul McGillion as Dr. Carson Beckett
 And David Hewlett as Dr. Rodney McKay

Episodes

Episodes in bold are continuous episodes, where the story spans over 2 or more episodes.

Production
 Richard Kind, who played Lucius Lavin in "Irresistible" and "Irresponsible", also played a minor role as Gary Meyers in the original Stargate film. He is the only actor to appear in both the film and Stargate: Atlantis.
 "Common Ground" introduces the "Todd" Wraith character that plays an important role in the later Seasons.
 "Sunday" marks the last to feature Paul McGillion as a regular cast member, although he is still in the opening titles for the rest of Season 3.
 "First Strike" introduces Jewel Staite as new Chief Medical Officer Dr. Jennifer Keller.

DVD releases

Awards

"No Man's Land" won a Gemini Award for "Best Visual Effects". For "McKay and Mrs. Miller", writer Martin Gero was nominated for a Gemini Award in the category "Best Writing in a Dramatic Series".

References

External links

 Season 3 on GateWorld
 Season 3 on IMDb
 Season 3 on TV.com
 

.3
2006 American television seasons
2007 American television seasons
Atlantis 03
2006 Canadian television seasons
2007 Canadian television seasons